Sir William Frederick Haynes-Smith  (26 June 1839 – 18 December 1928) was an English colonial administrator in the British Empire.

Early life
Haynes-Smith was born in Blackheath, Kent on 26 June 1839. He was the fifth son of John Lucie Smith L.L.D. and Martha Bean. He was Uncle to Sir Alfred Lucie-Smith, who was also a colonial judge who married first Rose Alice Emerentiana Aves and second Meta Mary Ross (a daughter of Sir David Palmer Ross).

Career
He was called to the Bar by the Middle Temple in 1863, and shortly after was sent to British Guiana as Solicitor-General. In 1874, he was appointed Attorney-General. A decade later, he served as acting Governor for a few months, which he also did 1887. In November 1888, he was appointed Governor of the Leeward Islands, followed by a transfer to the Bahamas in 1895. He served as High Commissioner of Cyprus from 1898 to 1904.

He was appointed a Companion of the Order of St Michael and St George in 1887, and knighted in the same order in 1890.

Personal life

In 1867, he was married to Ellen Parkinson White (1838–1923) at Tunbridge Wells. Ellen was a daughter of English-born James Thomas White (son of Dr. Andrew White FRCS) and Anne Gordon Hubbard (daughter of John Hubbard and Jane (née Parkinson) Hubbard). Ellen's aunt, Mary Greene Hubbard, was the second wife of Russell Sturgis, an American merchant and banker who was the head of Baring Brothers in London. Together, they were the parents of a son and a daughter:

 William Haynes-Smith (1871–1937), who was the partner of writer Howard Sturgis (a son of Russell Sturgis from his third wife) until his death in 1920.  In 1924, when both were in their 50s, he married Alice Maud Russell Sturgis (1868–1964), a daughter of American architect John Hubbard Sturgis and the niece of his later partner.
 Anne Haynes-Smith (1870–1963), who married Rear Admiral Edward Cecil Villiers, a son of Rev. Charles Villiers and Florence Mary Tyssen-Amherst. His brother was Ernest Villiers, MP for Brighton (and husband of Hon. Elaine Guest, daughter of Ivor Guest, 1st Baron Wimborne). He was a grandson of Thomas Hyde Villiers, great-grandson of the Hon. George Villiers, and a 2x great-grandson of Thomas Villiers, 1st Earl of Clarendon.

In 1920, he purchased Brandon Park in Suffolk.  He died at Turleigh Mill in Bradford-on-Avon, Wiltshire on 18 December 1928.

Descendants
Through his daughter Anne, he was a grandfather of Vice Admiral Sir Michael Villiers, the Fourth Sea Lord and Vice Controller of the Navy.

Appointments 
 1874–1888 Attorney General of British Guiana.
 1884 Governor of British Guiana, acting for Sir Henry Turner Irving
 1888–1895 Governor of Antigua and Barbuda
 1895–1898 Governor of the Bahamas and of the Leeward Islands
 1898–1904 High Commissioner of Cyprus

References 

1839 births
1928 deaths
Members of the Middle Temple
Antigua and Barbuda politicians
British colonial governors and administrators in Asia
Attorneys-General of British Guiana
Governors of British Guiana
British governors of the Bahamas
Governors of the Leeward Islands
Knights Commander of the Order of St Michael and St George
British Cyprus people
British colonial governors and administrators in Europe